Guárico River is a river in Venezuela.

Rivers of Venezuela